WAP four-disulfide core domain 15A is a protein that in the mouse is encoded by the Wfdc15a gene.

References 

Mouse proteins